The 1971–72 Illinois State Redbirds men's basketball team represented Illinois State University during the 1971–72 NCAA University Division men's basketball season. The Redbirds, led by second-year head coach Will Robinsion, played their home games at Horton Field House in Normal, Illinois as members of the Conference of Midwestern Universities. They finished the season 16–10, 6–2 in conference play to finish in second place.

Roster

Schedule

|-
!colspan=9 style=|Regular season

Source

References

Illinois State Redbirds men's basketball seasons
Illinois State
Illinois State Redbirds men's basketball
Illinois State Redbirds men's basketball